Muhammad Mamoon Tarar is a Pakistani politician who had been a member of the Provincial Assembly of the Punjab from August 2018 till January 2023.

References

{{Provisional Assembly Of Punjab Profile}}
Chairperson Tevta Punjab 
{{Profile Link/}}
{{}}

Living people
Punjab MPAs 2018–2023
Pakistan Tehreek-e-Insaf MPAs (Punjab)
Year of birth missing (living people)